Bentwitchen is a hamlet in Devon, England.

References

Hamlets in Devon